Proacoenonia is a genus of wood midges in the family Cecidomyiidae. The single described species, Proacoenonia olgae, is only known from amber inclusions from the Lower Eocene of France.

References

Cecidomyiidae genera

Insects described in 2006
Fossil taxa described in 2006
Monotypic Diptera genera
Diptera of Europe
Taxa named by Andre Nel
Prehistoric Diptera genera
Taxa named by Jakub Prokop